The 1999–2000 Copa Federación de España was the seventh staging of the Copa Federación de España, a knockout competition for Spanish football clubs in Segunda División B and Tercera División.

The Regional stages began in 1999, while the national tournament took place from November 1999 to April 2000.

Regional tournaments

Asturias tournament

Source:

National tournament

Preliminary round

|}
Lucentino received a bye.

Round of 16

|}

Quarter-finals

|}

Semifinals

|}

Final

|}

References

External links
2000–2009 Copa Federación results
Asturias tournament results

Copa Federación de España seasons